Jure uxoris (a Latin phrase meaning "by right of (his) wife") describes a title of nobility used by a man because his wife holds the office or title suo jure ("in her own right"). Similarly, the husband of an heiress could become the legal possessor of her lands. For example, married women in England and Wales were legally incapable of owning real estate until the Married Women's Property Act 1882.

Kings who ruled jure uxoris were regarded as co-rulers with their wives and are not to be confused with king consort, who were merely consorts of their wives.

Middle Ages
During the feudal era, the husband's control over his wife's real property, including titles, was substantial. On marriage, the husband gained the right to possess his wife's land during the marriage, including any acquired after the marriage. Whilst he did not gain the formal legal title to the lands, he was able to spend the rents and profits of the land and sell his right, even if the wife protested.

The concept of jure uxoris was standard in the Middle Ages even for queens regnant. In the Kingdom of Jerusalem, Fulk, King of Jerusalem; Guy of Lusignan; Conrad of Montferrat; Henry II, Count of Champagne; and Amalric II of Jerusalem all received their titles as a result of marriage. Another famous instance of jure uxoris occurring was in the case of Richard Neville, 16th Earl of Warwick, who gained said title via his marriage to Anne Beauchamp, 16th Countess of Warwick, herself a daughter of Richard Beauchamp, 13th Earl of Warwick.

Sigismund of Luxembourg married Queen Mary of Hungary and obtained the crown through her, retaining it after her death in 1395. After the death of Sigismund, Albert II of Austria inherited the throne of Hungary by marrying the king's daughter Elizabeth of Luxembourg.

A man who held a title jure uxoris could retain it even after the death or divorce of his wife. When the marriage of Marie I of Boulogne and Matthew of Boulogne was annulled in 1170, Marie ceased to be countess, while Matthew I continued to reign until 1173. In some cases, the kingdom could pass to the husband's heirs, even when they were not issue of the wife in question (e.g. Jogaila, who became king by marrying Jadwiga and passed on the kingdom to his children with Sophia of Halshany).

Kings jure uxoris in the medieval era include:
Rudolph of France, whose wife Emma was daughter of King Robert I of France
Philip I of Navarre, who was married to Joan I of Navarre
Frederick II, Holy Roman Emperor, who was named King of Jerusalem by virtue of his marriage to Isabella II of Jerusalem
Louis I of Naples, whose wife was Joanna I of Naples
Philip III of Navarre, who was married to Joan II of Navarre
John I of Castile, who was a claimant to the throne of Portugal by virtue of his marriage to Beatrice of Portugal
Guy of Lusignan, who ruled as King of Jerusalem by right of marriage to Sibylla of Jerusalem
Philip II of Spain, who ruled as King of England by right of his marriage to Mary I of England
Władysław II Jagiełło, who ruled as King of Poland by right of his marriage to Jadwiga of Poland

Renaissance
By the time of the Renaissance, laws and customs had changed in some countries: a woman sometimes remained monarch, with only part of her power transferred to her husband. This was usually the case when multiple kingdoms were consolidated, such as when Isabella and Ferdinand shared crowns.

The precedent of jure uxoris complicated the lives of Henry VIII's daughters, both of whom inherited the throne in their own right. The marriage of Mary I to King Philip in 1554 was seen as a political act, as an attempt to bring England and Ireland under the influence of Catholic Spain. Parliament passed the Act for the Marriage of Queen Mary to Philip of Spain specifically to prevent Philip from seizing power on the basis of jure uxoris. As it turned out, the marriage produced no children, and Mary died in 1558, ending Philip's jure uxoris claims in England and Ireland, as envisaged by the Act, and was followed by the accession of Elizabeth I. She, in turn, resolved concerns over jure uxoris by never marrying. 

In Navarre, Jeanne d'Albret had married Antoine of Navarre in 1548, and she became queen regnant at her father's death in 1555. Antoine was crowned co-ruler jure uxoris with Jeanne in August.

Partial transference of power
In Great Britain, husbands acted on their wives' behalf in the House of Lords, from which women were once barred. These offices were exercised jure uxoris.

When Lady Priscilla Bertie inherited the title Baroness Willougby de Eresby in 1780, she also held the position of Lord Great Chamberlain. However, her husband Sir Peter Gwydyr acted on her behalf in that office instead.

Conditions
In Portugal, a male consort could not become a king jure uxoris until the queen regnant had a child and royal heir. Although Queen Maria II married her second husband in 1836, Ferdinand of Saxe-Coburg-Gotha did not become King Ferdinand II until 1837, when their first child was born. Queen Maria's first husband, Auguste of Beauharnais, never became monarch, because he died before he could father an heir. The queen's child did not have to be born after her accession. For example, Queen Maria I already had children by her husband when she acceded, so he became King Peter III at the moment of his wife's accession.

 although he is not technically entitled to it under the law. For example, Jaime de Marichalar was often referred to as the Duke of Lugo during his marriage to Infanta Elena, Duchess of Lugo. After their divorce, he ceased to use the title. His brother-in-law Iñaki Urdangarin was referred to as the Duke of Palma before corruption allegations prompted the King to take action. Since 12 June  2015, he is no longer referred to as the Duke of Palma de Mallorca, following the removal of that title from his wife, Infanta Cristina.

See also
 Jure matris
 List of Latin phrases

References

Latin legal terminology
 
Nobility
Genealogy
Inheritance